Lymsworthy Meadows is a Site of Special Scientific Interest (SSSI) in north Cornwall, England, UK, noted for its biological characteristics.

Geography

The streams surrounding the SSSI are tributaries to the upper River Tamar.

Wildlife and ecology
The site's habitat mainly consists of moorland and culm grassland that is relatively untouched by agriculture, being one of only a few such sites remaining in Cornwall. The nationally scarce wavy St John's-wort (Hypericum undulatum) can be found on the site.

A colony of marsh fritillary butterflies (Eurodryas aurinia), a nationally scarce species, is also found on the site.

References

Sites of Special Scientific Interest in Cornwall
Sites of Special Scientific Interest notified in 1992
Meadows in Cornwall